Liolaemus chlorostictus is a species of lizard in the family  Liolaemidae. It is native to Bolivia and Argentina.

References

chlorostictus
Reptiles described in 1993
Reptiles of Bolivia
Reptiles of Argentina
Taxa named by Raymond Laurent